Vigoux is a commune in the Indre department in central France.

Geography
The river Abloux forms all of the commune's southwestern border.

Population

See also
Communes of the Indre department

References

Communes of Indre